The Senegalese Women's Cup is a women's association football competition in Senegal. pitting regional teams against each other. It was established in 2003. It is the women's equivalent of the Senegal FA Cup for men.

Finals

Most successful clubs

See also 
 Senegalese Women's Championship

External links 
 Senegal (Women), List of Cup Winners - rsssf.com

 
Sen
Football competitions in Senegal